Konner Kendall (born May 20, 1997) is a United States Virgin Islands international footballer who plays as a forward. Kendall has one goal against Cuba in 2020 Summer Olympics qualifying.

Club career
In early 2020 Kendall trialed with The Villages SC of the USL League Two and was expected to sign a contract before the COVID-19 pandemic ended the season.

In March 2021 Kendall signed for Moros FC of the UPSL.

In May of 2021 Kendall then moved to Tobacco Road FC of the USL League 2

Career statistics

International

Personal
Kendall is the brother of fellow USVI international Karson Kendall.

References

External links
 Konner Kendall at CaribbeanFootballDatabase
 
 

1997 births
Living people
Elon University alumni
United States Virgin Islands soccer players
United States Virgin Islands international soccer players
Association football forwards